Dai Xiaoxiang (15 December 1990, Xiamen) is a Chinese archer. At the 2012 Summer Olympics he won the bronze medal for his country in the Men's individual event.

References

External links
 
 
 
 
 

Chinese male archers
1990 births
Living people
Olympic archers of China
Olympic bronze medalists for China
Olympic medalists in archery
Archers at the 2012 Summer Olympics
Medalists at the 2012 Summer Olympics
Asian Games medalists in archery
Asian Games silver medalists for China
Archers at the 2010 Asian Games
Medalists at the 2010 Asian Games
Sportspeople from Fujian
People from Xiamen
21st-century Chinese people